Thiago Duchatsch Moreira (born 16 April 1997) is a Brazilian footballer who plays as a central defender for Ayutthaya United.

Club career
Born in Bauru, São Paulo, Duchatsch joined Corinthians' youth setup in April 2016, from Desportivo Brasil. On 29 May 2018, he moved to Santos and was assigned to the B-team.

On 4 January 2019, Duchatsch joined Tupi on loan for the season. He made his professional debut late in the month, coming on as a first-half substitute for injured Arthur Sanches in a 1–1 Campeonato Mineiro home draw against Villa Nova.

On 29 July 2019, after being rarely used, Duchatsch moved to Série C side Sampaio Corrêa, also in a temporary deal.

In August 2022 Duchatsch joined Ayutthaya United F.C.

Career statistics

References

External links

1997 births
Living people
People from Bauru
Brazilian footballers
Association football defenders
Santos FC players
Tupi Football Club players
Sampaio Corrêa Futebol Clube players
Clube Atlético Juventus players
Footballers from São Paulo (state)